HLDS may refer to:

 Half-Life Dedicated Server, a computer programming framework
 Hitachi-LG Data Storage, a joint venture between Hitachi and the LG group
 Hoek van Holland Strand railway station, in the Netherlands